Ahmed Ajeddou (born January 1, 1980 in Morocco) is a Moroccan football midfielder. He currently plays for FAR Rabat in Morocco.

Ajeddou played for FAR in the 2007 CAF Champions League group stages. 

He made his first cap for Morocco national football team in the friendly match against USA on 23 May 2008.

International career

International goals
Scores and results list Morocco's goal tally first.

References

External links 

Living people
1980 births
Moroccan footballers
Morocco international footballers
Moroccan expatriate footballers
Maghreb de Fès players
Al-Wakrah SC players
Wydad AC players
Expatriate footballers in Qatar
Expatriate footballers in Libya
Sportspeople from Marrakesh
Association football midfielders